Razor Eaters is a 2003 Australian crime thriller film written and directed by Shannon Young. The film had its world premiere on 13 July 2003 at the Melbourne Underground Film Festival, and later had a DVD release in July 2006. It follows an anarchist street gang (based on the real-life Hedge-Burners) who terrorize those whom they believe deserve punishment.

Razor Eaters was met with some controversy, as the Melbourne police department labeled it as "Extremely Violent" and "Obscene" when it was first released in 2003.

Synopsis
Unhappy with the modern day legal system, five men have decided to band together to hand out vigilante justice to anyone they think deserves it. This list is rather loose, as they include tailgaters along with drug dealers and other serious criminals. The band, which calls themselves "Razor Eaters" and videotapes all of their activities, has attracted the attention of Detective Danny Berdan (Paul Moder), who finds himself captivated by the gang's footage.

Cast
Paul Moder as Danny Berdan
Richard Cawthorne as Zach
Teague Rook as Orville
Fletcher Humphrys as Roger
Campbell Usher as Anthony
Shannon Young as Rob
Matt Robertson as Chris
Julie Eckersley as Jenny
David Bradshaw as Hersch
Vincent Gil as Lonnie Evans (as Vince Gil)
Peter Hosking as Hurstleigh
Angus Sampson as Syksey
Craig Madden as Garth
David Serafin as Parking Inspector
Chris McLean as Dean

Production
Young loosely based the film's concept on the "Hedge Burners", a group of vandals that videotaped themselves vandalizing property. He chose to escalate the actions to become more violent for the film, as Young believed that having the Razor Eaters only commit vandalism would "get boring in about half an hour" and that they needed "to have a purpose, a goal". Young decided to make the gang's goal be infamy and stated that "I think we set a really dangerous standard by the amount of publicity that we give to criminals." In order to flesh out the characters, Young had the actors improvise various scenarios such as "how they met, how they came together as a group".

Reception
Critical reception for Razor Eatershas been predominantly positive. Film Threat wrote a positive review and gave Razor Eaters five stars while stating it was "classy, intrepid and totally refined". JoBlo.com gave a positive review for the film but a negative review for the DVD release, criticizing its picture and audio quality.

Awards
Best Use of the Guerilla Aesthetic at the Melbourne Underground Film Festival (2003, won)
Special Jury Award at the Melbourne Underground Film Festival (2003, won)
Festival Prize for Best Actor (Richard Cawthorne) at Shriekfest (2005, won) 
Best Thriller Feature at Shriekfest (2005, won)

References

External links

2003 films
2003 crime thriller films
Australian crime thriller films
Films about terrorism
Films shot in Melbourne
2000s English-language films